These Our Actors is an original novel based on the U.S. television series Buffy the Vampire Slayer.

Plot summary

Even though Buffy decided to drop drama class to concentrate on her slaying and taking care of Dawn, Willow still decided keep the class on her course list. She becomes engrossed in it, especially when the teacher, Professor Addams, begins discussing rituals and chants involved in old dramatic works. Unfortunately, the professor, realizing that Willow has some power of her own, decides to use her for his own ends. He needs to locate a particularly powerful book used to summon the Fates, which he believes is located somewhere in Sunnydale. Spike and Willow realise that the professor is actually the father of Spike's mortal love interest, Cecily, who is attempting to use the power of the fates to resurrect his daughter after he accidentally killed her due to Spike's actions in his early days as a vampire.

Continuity

Set in Buffy season 5. Willow and Tara's relationship is known by the Scooby Gang.
The book assumes that Cecily (here named 'Addams') and Halfrek are not one and the same; indeed, Cecily is killed during the flashbacks.

Canonical issues

Buffy books such as this one are not usually considered by fans as canonical. Some fans consider them stories from the imaginations of authors and artists, while other fans consider them as taking place in an alternative fictional reality. However unlike fan fiction, overviews summarising their story, written early in the writing process, were 'approved' by both Fox and Joss Whedon (or his office), and the books were therefore later published as officially Buffy/Angel merchandise.

External links

Reviews
Litefoot1969.bravepages.com - Review of this book by Litefoot
Nika-summers.com - Review of this book by Nika Summers

2002 American novels
Books based on Buffy the Vampire Slayer